Maliwan Prabnarong (born 27 August 1990) is a Thai indoor volleyball. With her club Bangkok Glass she competed at the 2016 World Club Championship.

Awards

Individuals
 2013–2014 Thailand League "Best Opposite Spiker"

Clubs
 2014–2015 Thailand League -  Champion, with Bangkok Glass
 2015 Thai-Denmark Super League -  Champion, with Bangkok Glass
 2015 Asian Club Championship -  Champion, with Bangkok Glass
 2015–2016 Thailand League -  Champion, with Bangkok Glass
 2016 Thai-Denmark Super League -  Champion, with Bangkok Glass
 2016–17 Thailand League -  Runner-up, with Bangkok Glass
 2017 Thai-Denmark Super League -  Runner-up, with Bangkok Glass
 2017–18 Thailand League -  Third, with Bangkok Glass
 2018 Thai-Denmark Super League -  Runner-up, with Bangkok Glass

References

External links
 FIVB Profile

1990 births
Living people
Maliwan Prabnarong
Maliwan Prabnarong
Maliwan Prabnarong
Maliwan Prabnarong